Barbara L. Toles was a Democratic Party member of the Wisconsin State Assembly, who represented the 17th Assembly District from 2004 to 2012. She won a special election in January 2004. Toles resigned from the Assembly in July 2012.

Notes

External links
Wisconsin Assembly - Representative Barbara Toles official government website
 
 Follow the Money - Barbara Toles
2008 2006 2004 campaign contributions

Democratic Party members of the Wisconsin State Assembly
1956 births
Living people
Women state legislators in Wisconsin
Politicians from Milwaukee
University of Wisconsin–Madison alumni
Marquette University alumni
African-American state legislators in Wisconsin
African-American women in politics
21st-century American politicians
21st-century American women politicians
21st-century African-American women
21st-century African-American politicians
20th-century African-American people
20th-century African-American women